John Thompson Nixon (August 31, 1820 – September 28, 1889) was a United States representative from New Jersey and a United States district judge of the United States District Court for the District of New Jersey.

Nixon was nominated by President Ulysses Grant on April 28, 1870, to a seat vacated by Richard S. Field. He was confirmed by the United States Senate on April 29, 1870, and received commission on April 28, 1870. Nixon's service was terminated on September 28, 1889, due to death.

Education and career

Born on August 31, 1820, in Fairton, Cumberland County, New Jersey, Nixon attended the public schools, graduated from the College of New Jersey (now Princeton University) in 1841 and received an Artium Magister degree from the same institution in 1843. He read law in 1844 and was admitted to the bar in 1845. He entered private practice in Bridgeton, New Jersey from 1845 to 1859. He was a member of the New Jersey General Assembly from 1848 to 1850, serving as Speaker in 1850.

Congressional service

Nixon was elected as a Republican from New Jersey's 1st congressional district to the United States House of Representatives of the 36th and 37th United States Congresses, serving from March 4, 1859, to March 3, 1863. He was not a candidate for renomination in 1862. Following his departure from Congress, he resumed private practice in Bridgeton from 1863 to 1870.

Federal judicial service

Nixon was nominated by President Ulysses S. Grant on April 28, 1870, to a seat on the United States District Court for the District of New Jersey vacated by Judge Richard Stockton Field. He was confirmed by the United States Senate on April 28, 1870, and received his commission the same day. His service terminated on September 28, 1889, due to his death at his summer home in Stockbridge, Berkshire County, Massachusetts. He was interred in Old Broad Street Presbyterian Church and Cemetery in Bridgeton.

Note

References

Sources

 John Thompson Nixon at The Political Graveyard

External links

 
 

Judges of the United States District Court for the District of New Jersey
Speakers of the New Jersey General Assembly
Republican Party members of the New Jersey General Assembly
United States federal judges appointed by Ulysses S. Grant
19th-century American judges
Princeton University alumni
1820 births
1889 deaths
Burials in New Jersey
Republican Party members of the United States House of Representatives from New Jersey
19th-century American politicians
People from Fairfield Township, Cumberland County, New Jersey
Politicians from Cumberland County, New Jersey